Israel competed at the 2000 Summer Olympics in Sydney, Australia. 39 competitors, 29 men and 10 women, took part in 43 events in 9 sports. The delegation of 39 athletes was the biggest at the time, and third-biggest in history, after 2008 with 40 and 2016 with 47.

Medalists

Bronze
 Michael Kolganov — Canoeing, Men's K1 500m Kayak Singles

Athletics

Men's track

Men's field

Canoeing

Fencing

Judo

Rhythmic gymnastics

Sailing

Israel competed in four events in the Sailing venue at the 2000 Olympics. They had two top ten finishes, including 4th place in the women's 470.

Shooting

Swimming

Men

Women

Wrestling

See also
Israel at the 2000 Summer Paralympics

Notes
Wallechinsky, David (2004). The Complete Book of the Summer Olympics (Athens 2004 Edition). Toronto, Canada. . 
International Olympic Committee (2001). The Results. Retrieved 12 November 2005.
Sydney Organising Committee for the Olympic Games (2001). Official Report of the XXVII Olympiad Volume 1: Preparing for the Games. Retrieved 20 November 2005.
Sydney Organising Committee for the Olympic Games (2001). Official Report of the XXVII Olympiad Volume 2: Celebrating the Games. Retrieved 20 November 2005.
Sydney Organising Committee for the Olympic Games (2001). The Results. Retrieved 20 November 2005.
International Olympic Committee Web Site

References

Nations at the 2000 Summer Olympics
2000 Summer Olympics
Summer Olympics